Smyrna is an unincorporated community in Grant County, in the U.S. state of Washington.

History
A post office called Smyrna was established in 1911, and remained in operation until 1964. The community was named after the ancient city of Smyrna.

References

Unincorporated communities in Grant County, Washington
Unincorporated communities in Washington (state)